Mister Iks is a Russian musical comedy film in black and white, directed by . It is based on the Leningrad Theatre of Musical Comedy operetta of the same name from 1956. The operetta itself was a Russian adaptation of Emmerich Kálmán's Die Zirkusprinzessin (The Circus Princess).

Filming began in 1957, with many of the actors and artists from the Leningrad Theatre working on the film. It premiered in the Soviet Union and other countries on May 2, 1958.

Plot
A mysterious man with the name "Mister Iks" performs in a circle, playing violin on a chair suspended in the air by ropes. His breathtakingly sad melodies reflect his internal turmoil – his love for a noble woman, which is frowned upon by society because of his being a circus performer (and therefore a third-class citizen.) A beautiful story of friendship, love, and circus is accompanied by the voices of the actors.

Although the music is from Kálmán's operetta, the setting was changed from Tsarist Russia to France.

Cast
 Georg Ots as Mister X
  as Theodora Verdier (Princess Fedora Palinska in the operetta, vocals by Tamara Bogdanova)
 Glikeriya Bogdanova-Chesnokova as Karolina (Carla Schlumberger in the operetta)
  as Pelican (Samuel Pressburger in the operetta)
  as Marie Latouche (Miss Mabel Gibson in the operetta)
  as Toni (Toni Schlumberger in the operetta)
  as Baron de Kreveliyak (Prinz Sergius Wladimir in the operetta)
  (or Lintz) as Poisson (Count Sakusin in the operetta)
  as Director of the circus (Director Stanislawski in the operetta)
 Yefim Kopelyan as a Theodora's fan (uncredited)
 Georgy Kuhlbush as a Theodora's fan (uncredited)
  as boy servant (uncredited)

Crew
Script writers: Nora Rubinstein, Yuli Khmelnitsky
Lyrics:  (Kálmán's music was used, but all Russian text for songs was changed by Olga Fadeeva).
Director: Yuliy Khmelnitsky
Operator: 
Designers: , 
Stage manager: 
Soundman: Rostislav Lapinsky
Costume designer: Tamara Levitskaya
Film editor: N. Razumova
Circus consultant: Georgy Venetsianov
Editors: Isaac Glikman, Andrey Donatov
Trick filming:
Operator: B. Dudov
Designers: Maria Kandat, Marina Bologovskaya
Orchestra of the 
Conductor: 
Choreographer: Leonid Travinin
Film directors: , A. Dombrovsky

Changes from the operetta
Although the film was based on Emmerich Kálmán's Die Zirkusprinzessin, which had premiered at Theater an der Wien in Vienna on 26 March 1926, significant changes had to be made because the operetta was set in Tsarist Russia and as such had many themes which were unacceptable to the censors. The film was set in Paris, rather than Saint Petersburg, the characters became French, and Mister Iks's Hussar's aria was replaced by a marine aria. The actor  who played Pelican wrote:

"No Kalman operetta made in the Soviet Union had as many different variants as The Circus Princess. For example, when it first premiered in the Soviet Union, the operetta had one embodiment in Moscow, and another in Leningrad. In Moscow, the troupe's "first comedian" portrayed the Russian Grand Duke Nikolai Nikolaevich in exile in Paris; in Leningrad, he was replaced by a rich American, and Pelican, the restaurant's lackey, turned out to be a Russian general, a White émigré. In further versions of this operetta, the émigrés disappeared."

References

External links
 

1958 musical comedy films
1958 films
Circus films
Cold War Soviet intelligence films
Lenfilm films
Operetta films
Soviet black-and-white films
Soviet musical comedy films